Cardinal Newman High School is a Roman Catholic, co-educational, comprehensive secondary school located in Bellshill, North Lanarkshire, Scotland. The school was formed by the amalgamation of Elmwood Secondary, St. Saviour's High School and St. Catherine's. The school's catchment area includes Bellshill, Mossend, Viewpark, Birkenshaw and Tannochside. The feeder primary schools are St Gerard's, Sacred Heart, Holy Family and John Paul II (St John the Baptist Primary in Uddingston [was re-aligned to Holy Cross High School, Hamilton).

Senior management
The Headteacher is Mr Robert Smith, he is assisted by 5 Depute Heads. Mr J Brown (S4), Mrs. L Fagan (S4), Mrs T McDade (S5-S6), Mrs H McGhee (S1-S2) and Mrs M Murray (S3).

Name
In 1977, the school was named after Cardinal Henry Newman by Monsignor Philip Flanagan, the then Parish Priest of Sacred Heart Parish and a former Rector of the Scots College in Rome.

Uniform
The uniform for all pupils is a white shirt, black trousers or a black skirt and a black blazer. S1-S4 pupils wear a striped blue, yellow and red tie, whereas S5 years wear a plain blue tie and S6 pupils have the same tie with red stripes. The S6 blazer is black with blue braiding.

Houses
The school has four houses all named after Scottish Saints, Andrew, Columba, Kentigern and Ninian.

Upgrade
In 2017, North Lanarkshire Council pledged £2 million to the school as part of a modernisation scheme to develop more facilities for the school. This funding was used to open a multi-use games area at the rear of the school during the session of the 40th anniversary of the school.

In the media
The school was featured in the Scottish Catholic Observer newspaper and website after a group of staff and pupils embarked on a pilgrimage to Cofton Park, Birmingham to attend the beatification mass of the school's namesake.

In February 2013, Cardinal O'Brien visited the school to bless a large set of Rosary beads to launch the Mission Matter Rosary Campaign.

Notable alumni
Steven Bonnar, Scottish National Party politician who has served as Member of Parliament (MP) for Coatbridge, Chryston and Bellshill since 2019
Barry Burns, Scottish musician best known for his work with post-rock band Mogwai
Ciaran McKenna, Scottish professional footballer who plays as a defender for Partick Thistle
Shaun Rooney, Scottish professional footballer who plays as a defender for St Johnstone
Anthony Ralston, Scottish professional footballer who plays as a defender for Celtic and  Scotland
Barry Maguire, Scottish professional footballer who plays as a defender for Motherwell
Chris Maguire, Scottish professional footballer who plays as a forward for Lincoln City

Notable teachers
A notable teacher at the school was William Collum, a football referee in the Scottish Premier League, Scottish Football League and UEFA competitions, who was the principal teacher of religious education.

References

External links
HMIE Report
School website
Cardinal Newman's page on LTS's 'Scottish Schools Online'
Education Scotland - Summarised inspection findings for Cardinal Newman High School, Bellshill - 07/03/17

Bellshill
Catholic secondary schools in North Lanarkshire
1977 establishments in Scotland
Educational institutions established in 1977